Gastrimargus musicus, the yellow-winged locust or yellow-winged grasshopper, is a common grasshopper in Australia. It only displays its yellow back wings in flight, when it also emits a loud clicking sound. When swarming, the adults become dark brown. They are sometimes confused with the Australian plague locust (Chortoicetes terminifera), though the yellow winged locust is "stouter and larger".

References

Oedipodinae
Insects described in 1775
Taxa named by Johan Christian Fabricius
Orthoptera of Australia